The Northern Territory Minister for Aboriginal Affairs is a Minister of the Crown in the Government of the Northern Territory. The minister administers their portfolio through the Department of the Chief Minister.

The Minister is responsible for Aboriginal affairs policy and coordination and the Office of Aboriginal Affairs.

The current minister is Selena Uibo (Labor). She was sworn in on 31 January 2019 following the dismissal of Ken Vowles on 21 December 2018 for breaking Cabinet confidentiality.

List of Ministers for Aboriginal Affairs

Former posts

Minister Assisting the Chief Minister

References

Northern Territory-related lists
Ministers of the Northern Territory government